Twelve Disciples of Nelson Mandela is a 2005 documentary film about a generation of men, considered terrorists by the U.S. government, who left South Africa to form the African National Congress and spread their message across the world. Filmmaker Thomas Allen Harris focuses on his stepfather Benjamin Pule Leinaeng, who was among the first ANC members to leave South Africa in 1960.

Twelve Disciples of Nelson Mandela was met with critical acclaim, winning an Independent Spirit Award nomination for its Stranger Than Fiction category and was aired on PBS as part of its Point of View series in 2006.

References

External links
 
 Tavis Smiley Interview with Thomas Allen Harris
 P.O.V. Twelve Disciples of Nelson Mandela - PBS's site dedicated to the film

2005 films
POV (TV series) films
African National Congress
Documentary films about revolutionaries
Nelson Mandela
Documentary films about apartheid
Films directed by Thomas Allen Harris
2005 documentary films
2000s English-language films
2000s American films